Eucalyptus bancroftii, commonly known as Bancroft's red gum or orange gum, is a species of tree that is endemic to eastern Australia. It has smooth bark, lance-shaped or curved adult leaves, flower buds usually arranged in groups of seven, white flowers and cup-shaped, conical or hemispherical fruit.

Description

The flowers are in groups of seven on a stem of length  with four angles. Each flower is on a terete stem (pedicel) of length .

Taxonomy and naming
Bancroft's red gum was first formally described in 1904 by Joseph Maiden who gave it the name Eucalyptus tereticornis var. bancroftii and published the description in his book The Forest Flora of New South Wales. In 1917, Maiden raised the variety to species status as E. bancroftii, publishing the change in A Critical Revision of the Genus Eucalyptus. Maiden noted that he collected the type specimen "from Honeysuckle Flat, about 9 miles south of Port Macquarie, N.S.W., on serpentine country bearing stunted vegetation" in July, 1895. The specific epithet (bancroftii) honours "Dr. Thomas Lane Bancroft" for his assistance to Maiden.

Distribution and habitat
Eucalyptus bancroftii occurs from Maitland and Port Macquarie in New South Wales north to the Tin Can Bay - Boonooroo area in Queensland. It is mainly found in coastal areas but extends to the adjacent tablelands and grows in open forest and woodland, sometimes in low swampy sites but also on rock outcrops on the tablelands.

References

bancroftii
Myrtales of Australia
Trees of Australia
Flora of New South Wales
Flora of Queensland
Taxa named by Joseph Maiden
Plants described in 1904